The Charles N. Rix House is a historic house at 628 Quapaw Avenue in Hot Springs, Arkansas.  It is a two-story American Foursquare wood-frame structure, with a hip roof and a brick foundation.  It has a single-story porch extending across its front, supported by Ionic columns and a turned-spindle balustrade.  The roof is adorned with projecting dormers.  The house was probably built about 1907, by Charles N. Rix, a banker who moved to Hot Springs in 1879, and was a leading force in the development of the city as a resort center.

The house was listed on the National Register of Historic Places in 1992.

See also
National Register of Historic Places listings in Garland County, Arkansas

References

Houses on the National Register of Historic Places in Arkansas
Colonial Revival architecture in Arkansas
Houses in Hot Springs, Arkansas
National Register of Historic Places in Hot Springs, Arkansas
Historic district contributing properties in Arkansas